The Canadian Folk Music Award for Children's Album of the Year is a Canadian award, presented as part of the Canadian Folk Music Awards to honour the year's best children's music.

2000s

2010s

2020s

References

Children's